Rafkat Ruziyev (born 25 July 1973) is a Uzbekistani fencer. He competed in the individual foil event at the 1996 Summer Olympics.

References

External links
 

1973 births
Living people
Uzbekistani male foil fencers
Olympic fencers of Uzbekistan
Fencers at the 1996 Summer Olympics
20th-century Uzbekistani people